The Gamwell House was designed by architects Longstaff & Black and was built in 1892.  It is one of the most distinguished Late Victorian era homes in the area of Bellingham, Washington.  It was listed on the National Register of Historic Places in 1972.

The architectural firm of Longstaff and Black was "an eastern firm who had come
from the Boston area to the Bellingham Bay real estate boom"; they also are credited with designing the Cascade County Courthouse in Montana.

References

Houses on the National Register of Historic Places in Washington (state)
Victorian architecture in Washington (state)
Houses completed in 1890
Buildings and structures in Bellingham, Washington
Houses in Whatcom County, Washington
National Register of Historic Places in Whatcom County, Washington